Andrew Palmer is an American rock climber. In October 2013, he became one of ten American climbers to climb the grade of  when he repeated Jaws II.

References

American rock climbers
Living people
Year of birth missing (living people)
Place of birth missing (living people)